St. Stephen's Episcopal Church is a historic Episcopal church located at Olean in Cattaraugus County, New York. It is a Gothic Revival style church building designed by upstate New York architect Robert W. Gibson (1854–1927) and constructed 1889–1890. The complex also includes the Ashton Parish House, constructed 1922–1923, and the rectory, known as the Watson Wing, built about 1885.  It is home to Olean's oldest continuously operating congregation, established in 1830.

It was listed on the National Register of Historic Places in 2001.

References

External links
Historical marker/historic landmark for St. Stephen's Episcopal Church Complex in Olean, NY

Churches on the National Register of Historic Places in New York (state)
Episcopal church buildings in New York (state)
Gothic Revival church buildings in New York (state)
Churches completed in 1890
19th-century Episcopal church buildings
Religious organizations established in 1830
Churches in Cattaraugus County, New York
1830 establishments in New York (state)
National Register of Historic Places in Cattaraugus County, New York
Robert W. Gibson church buildings